Twenty Concorde aircraft were built, six for development and 14 for commercial service.

Two prototypes
Two pre-production aircraft
Two development aircraft
14 production aircraft

All of these, except two of the production aircraft, are preserved. One aircraft was scrapped in 1994, and another was destroyed in the Air France Flight 4590 crash in 2000.

Prototypes

The two prototype aircraft were used to expand the flight envelope of the aircraft as quickly as possible and prove that the design calculations for supersonic flight were correct.

 F-WTSS (production designation 001) was the first Concorde to fly, on 2 March 1969, and was retired on arrival at the French air museum at Le Bourget Airport on 19 October 1973, having made 397 flights covering 812 hours, of which 255 hours were at supersonic speeds. Concorde 001 was modified for the 1973 solar eclipse mission with rooftop portholes and observation equipment. Its flight over Africa became the longest observation of a solar eclipse, lasting some 74 minutes. It remains in its Solar Eclipse mission livery complete with rooftop portholes.
 G-BSST (002) first flew on 9 April 1969 from Filton to RAF Fairford. Its last flight was on 4 March 1976 when it flew to the Fleet Air Arm Museum at the Royal Naval Air Station Yeovilton, England. It had made 438 flights (836 hours), of which 196 flights were supersonic.

Pre-production aircraft

Both pre-production aircraft were used to further develop the design of the aircraft. Changes to design include different wing planform, more fuel, different engine standard and different air intake systems.

Concorde G-AXDN (101) first flew on 17 December 1971 from Filton and was retired to the Imperial War Museum Duxford, England, where it landed on 20 August 1977, having made 269 flights (632 hours), of which 168 flights were supersonic.
Concorde F-WTSA (102) first flew on 10 January 1973 from Toulouse. It was the fourth aircraft and the first to have the features and the shape of the future production aircraft. It was the first to fly to the United States (on 20 September 1973 to Dallas, Texas). For several years the aircraft was painted in British Airways colours on one side and Air France colours on the other. It made 314 flights (656 hours), of which 189 were supersonic, and was then retired to Orly Airport in Paris on 20 May 1976, where it is on display to the public.

Development aircraft

The production aircraft were different in many ways from the original aircraft, necessitating re-examining certain areas to obtain certification. In all there were six "development" aircraft: the two prototypes (001/002), two pre-production (101/102) and two production aircraft (201/202).

F-WTSB (201) first flew on 6 December 1973 from Toulouse. Its last flight was on 19 April 1985 from Chateauroux to Toulouse; a total of 909 flying hours. It is currently inside the Aeroscopia museum near the Airbus factory at Toulouse.
G-BBDG (202) first flew on 13 December 1974 from Filton to RAF Fairford. It last flew on 24 December 1981 after a total of 1282 hours. Subsequently, it was stored in a hangar on the Filton Airfield and was used as a spare parts source by BA for their Concorde fleet. It was sectioned and moved by road in May/June 2004 to the Brooklands Museum in Weybridge, Surrey, where after restoration it was opened to the public in the summer of 2006.

British production aircraft
British Airways had seven production aircraft in commercial service:

G-BOAC (204) The flagship of the fleet (because of its BOAC registration) first flew on 27 February 1975 from Filton. It made its final flight to Manchester Airport – where a "glass hangar" was later built at the viewing park for its display – on 31 October 2003 after flying 22,260 hours.
G-BOAA (206) first flew on 5 November 1975 from Filton. This aircraft flew with the Red Arrows on 2 June 1996 to celebrate 50 years of Heathrow Airport. It last flew on 12 August 2000 as BA002 from New York JFK to London Heathrow after flying 22,768 hours, and did not receive modifications after the Paris crash. For its final journey it was transported to the National Museum of Flight (run by National Museums Scotland), East Fortune, near Edinburgh, over land to the Thames, then by sea to Torness, then over land again to the museum from 8 to 19 April 2004.

G-BOAB (208) first flew on 18 May 1976 from Filton. Its last flight was a positioning flight on 15 August 2000 as BA002P from New York JFK to London Heathrow after flying 22,296 hours. It remains at Heathrow Airport. It was never modified, and so never flew again after returning home following the Paris crash. G-BOAB was used by British Airways to carry out a test installation of the 'Project Rocket' interior that was later installed on the rest of the fleet, before remaining stationary for several years with its interior stripped, with boxes of magazines being used as ballast, and being periodically towed to various locations around the airport. Following minor restoration works in 2015 and 2017, the aircraft is used for apprentice training by BA.

G-BOAD (210) first flew on 25 August 1976 from Filton. It was repainted with Singapore Airlines livery on the left side and British Airways livery on the right for a joint service by the two airlines between Bahrain and Singapore International Airport at Paya Lebar for three months in 1977, and from 1979 to 1981. This aircraft made the fastest Atlantic crossing by any Concorde on 7 February 1996, taking off from New York JFK and landing in London Heathrow 2 hours, 52 minutes, and 59 seconds later. It departed from Heathrow for the final time on 10 November 2003 and flew to JFK, from where it was then transferred (on a barge originally used to move Space Shuttle external fuel tanks), to the Intrepid Sea-Air-Space Museum, New York, past the Statue of Liberty and up the Hudson River. Its engines were removed to reduce weight. Its temporary home was on a barge alongside the aircraft carrier Intrepid, pending the proposed creation of a quayside display hall; however, in December 2006, this Concorde was moved to Floyd Bennett Field in Brooklyn, where it was kept in poor conditions. G-BOAD's nose cone was knocked off by a truck at the end in June 2008. The damage was repaired and subsequently the aircraft was moved back to Pier 86 in Manhattan (and placed on the pier, rather than on a barge) on 20 October 2008 as part of the Intrepid Sea, Air & Space Museum. G-BOAD spent more time in the air than any other Concorde, at 23,397 hours.
G-BOAE (212) first flew on 17 March 1977 from Filton. On 1 July 1999 it flew in formation with the Red Arrows to mark the opening of the Scottish Parliament. Its last flight was to Grantley Adams International Airport in Bridgetown (Barbados) on 17 November 2003, with 70 members of BA staff on board. The flight, lasting less than 4 hours, reached the maximum certified height of 60,000 ft (18,300 m). It flew a total of 23,376 hours. A new exhibition was constructed to house the aircraft, east of the airport at the old Spencers Plantation.

G-BOAG (214) first flew on 21 April 1978 from Filton. The aircraft flew the final Speedbird 2 service from New York on 24 October 2003, and left Heathrow for the final time on 3 November. It spent a day "resting" and refuelling in New York before making its final flight on 5 November from New York JFK to Boeing Field, Seattle in an unusual supersonic flight (which required special permission) over the sparsely populated part of northern Canada. It is currently displayed at Seattle's Museum of Flight, alongside the first 707 that served as Air Force One and the prototype Boeing 747. This Concorde was once used as a source of spares, before being restored using parts from Air France's F-BVFD, and has flown 16,239 hours.
G-BOAF (216) first flew on 20 April 1979 from Filton and was the last Concorde to be built. It made Concorde's final flight on Wednesday 26 November 2003. Departing from Heathrow at 11:30 GMT, it made a last, brief, supersonic flight, carrying 100 BA staff, over the Bay of Biscay. It then flew a "lap of honour" above Bristol, passing over Portishead, Clevedon, Weston-super-Mare, Bristol Airport and Clifton Suspension Bridge, before landing at Filton, soon after 13:00 GMT. It was met by Prince Andrew, who formally accepted its handover. It had flown a total of 18,257 hours. Until 2010, the aircraft was open for public viewing at the Airbus facility; since 2017 it has been the main exhibit at Filton's Aerospace Bristol museum.

As part of tenth-anniversary celebrations on 24 December 1985, British Airways photographed G-BOAA, G-BOAC, G-BOAF and G-BOAG formation flying for their publicity material.

French production aircraft
Air France also had seven production aircraft in commercial service:
F-BTSC (203) was the Concorde lost in the crash of Air France Flight 4590 on 25 July 2000 in the small town of Gonesse, France near Le Bourget, located just outside Paris, killing 113 people. The remains of this aircraft are stored at a hangar at Le Bourget Airport. It is the only Concorde in the history of the design to be destroyed in a crash. It was also featured in the Airport film series The Concorde ... Airport '79. It first flew on 31 January 1975 from Toulouse and flew for 11,989 hours.

F-BVFA (205) First flew on 27 October 1975 from Toulouse. In 1988 it flew around the world in a record-breaking 41 hours 27 minutes. It made its final flight to the Smithsonian Institution National Air and Space Museum's new Steven F. Udvar-Hazy Center at Washington Dulles International Airport (USA) on 12 June 2003 after flying 17,824 hours.
F-BVFB (207) first flew on 6 March 1976 from Toulouse. It was sold for €1 to the Sinsheim Auto & Technik Museum in Germany. It flew to Karlsruhe-Baden–Baden Airpark, in south west Germany on 24 June 2003. After removal of its wings and tail fin, it traveled by barge and road, to join a Tupolev Tu-144 already on exhibit at Sinsheim. It had flown 14,771 hours.
F-BVFC (209) first flew on 9 July 1976 from Toulouse. It was retired to the Airbus plant at Toulouse, where the French aircraft were constructed, on 27 June 2003, joining 201 and ending Air France's relationship with Concorde. The final flight was supersonic, and included a go around at Toulouse. It had flown 14,332 hours. Since January 2015, it is on display outside the Aeroscopia museum near the Toulouse factory.
F-BVFD (211) first flew on 10 February 1977 from Toulouse. It was retired early, in 1982, having flown only 5,814 hours (final flight on 27 May 1982). Badly corroded after being stored outdoors, and damaged through use as a source of spare parts, it was broken up in 1994. It was the only Concorde scrapped. A small section of the fuselage remains at Le Bourget, France and the nose cone was sold to an American collector.
F-BTSD (213) first flew on 26 June 1978 from Toulouse. It was retired to the Air and Space museum at Le Bourget (France) on 14 June 2003, joining 001 after flying 12,974 hours. In 1996, this aircraft carried a promotional paint scheme (blue with logo) for Pepsi. The wings were kept white, and while in the Pepsi livery, it was restricted to flying at most 20 minutes at Mach 2.02 and otherwise Mach 1.7 (the plane normally requires a white livery to fly supersonic, because of the heat); the branding estimated to have cost Pepsi $20 million. It flew 16 flights around the Middle East in this livery. The plane also holds the world record for flying around the world in both directions: westbound in 32 hours 49 minutes and 3 seconds on 12/13 October 1992, and eastbound in 31 hours 27 minutes and 49 seconds on 15/16 August 1995. It also was the only Concorde to land in Central America and then it set a new time record between Juan Santamaria International Airport and John F. Kennedy International Airport.
F-BVFF (215) first flew on 26 December 1978 from Toulouse. It was undergoing D-check maintenance at the Air France maintenance hangar at Charles de Gaulle at the time of the 25 July 2000 crash which temporarily grounded all Concordes. After the withdrawal of the type was announced midway through refurbishment, it was cosmetically reassembled on the outside (outer shell only, no interior) and used as a display piece following the retirement of all Concordes. It last flew on a charter flight to Paris Charles de Gaulle on 11 June 2000 after flying 12,421 hours.

List of aircraft

References

Notes

Citations

External links

 British Airways Celebrating Concorde
 "Farewell to Concorde" (BBC)
 G-AXDN's movable nose in operation at Duxford, 2018

Concorde
History of aviation
Lists of Sud Aviation aircraft operators
Lists of British Aircraft Corporation aircraft operators